Kunice  (German: Kunitz) is a village in Legnica County, Lower Silesian Voivodeship, in south-western Poland. It is the seat of the administrative district (gmina) called Gmina Kunice. Prior to 1945 it was in Germany.

The village has a population of 1,100.

References

Villages in Legnica County